Rainford is a civil parish in St Helens, Merseyside, England.  It contains 27 buildings that are recorded in the National Heritage List for England as designated listed buildings.   Of these, one is listed at  Grade II*, the middle of the three grades, and the others are at Grade II, the lowest grade.  Apart from the village of Rainford, the parish is rural.  The listed buildings are mainly houses, farmhouses, farm buildings and associated structures.  Other listed buildings include a public house, a church, village stocks, a former mill, and a pair of statues.

Key

Buildings

References

Citations

Sources

Listed buildings in Merseyside
Lists of listed buildings in Merseyside
Buildings and structures in the Metropolitan Borough of St Helens